Giacciano con Baruchella is a comune (municipality) in the Province of Rovigo in the Italian region Veneto, located about  southwest of Venice and about  west of Rovigo.

Giacciano con Baruchella borders the following municipalities: Badia Polesine, Castagnaro, Castelnovo Bariano, Ceneselli, Trecenta, Villa Bartolomea.

Twin towns
Giacciano con Baruchella is twinned with:

  Ludza Municipality, Latvia

References

Cities and towns in Veneto